Luketic or Luketić is a surname of Croatian or Serbian origin. Notable people with the surname include:

Katarina Luketić (born 1998), Croatian volleyball player
Robert Luketic (born 1973), Australian film director

References

Croatian surnames
Serbian surnames